Robert Paul Weston (born 21 October 1975) is a British-born Canadian children's writer. His debut was the award-winning novel-in-verse, Zorgamazoo. His short fiction has appeared in literary journals in Canada, the UK and the United States.

His second novel, a dark fantasy for young adults entitled Dust City, was published in October 2010. The story is narrated by the son of the wolf who killed Little Red Riding Hood.

Personal life
Robert Paul Weston was born in 1975 in Dover, England to a British-Turkish father and an Indian-Grenadian mother. He graduated from Queen's University in 1998 with a BA in Film and Sociology. From 2002 to 2004, he worked in Japan as a high school teacher. In 2006, he completed a masters of arts degree in creative writing from the University of British Columbia. Weston currently lives in London, England.

Prizes and honours

2011 California Young Reader Medal (for Zorgamazoo)
2010 Silver Birch Fiction award (for Zorgamazoo)
2009 Shortlisted, E.B. White Read Aloud Award (for Zorgamazoo)
2009 Children's Literature Association Notable Books for 2009 (Zorgamazoo)

Works

Novels
Zorgamazoo (2008) Razorbill
Dust City (2010) Razorbill
The Creature Department (2013) Razorbill
Prince Puggly of Spud and the Kingdom of Spiff (2013) Puffin
Gobbled by Ghorks (A Creature Department Novel) (2014) Razorbill
Blues for Zoey (2016) Flux Books

Picture Books
Sakura's Cherry Blossoms (2018) Tundra
Natsumi's Song of Summer (2020) Tundra

Short stories
"Mourning Sickness", On Spec, No. 62, Winter 2005
"The Light Switch Method", Kiss Machine, No. 10, June 2005
"Thinking of Alice", Crimewave Magazine, Vol. 9, Fall 2006
"Stop Plate Tectonics", On Spec, No. 68, Spring 2007
"Paris, France (Somnumbulitis)", The New Orleans Review, Vol. 33, No. 1, Fall 2007
"Hummingbirds and Pie", Postscripts, Vol. 12, Autumn 2007
"Salve", Postscripts, Vol. 14, Spring 2008

References

External links
 
 Zorgamazoo (official) – with biographical blurb 
Way of the West (blog)
Interview, Just One More Book
"2008 - Ones to Watch", The Vancouver Sun
Online Interview
 
 

1975 births
21st-century British novelists
21st-century Canadian short story writers
British children's writers
British fantasy writers
British male short story writers
British male novelists
British people of Grenadian descent
British people of Turkish descent
Canadian people of Grenadian descent
Canadian people of Turkish descent
Canadian children's writers
Canadian fantasy writers
Canadian male short story writers
Canadian male novelists
English emigrants to Canada
People from Dover, Kent
Queen's University at Kingston alumni
University of British Columbia alumni
Writers from London
Living people
21st-century Canadian male writers